Polygnotus is a crater on Mercury, named by the IAU in 1976, after ancient Greek painter Polygnotus.

Polygnotus has a central peak ring which is embayed with smooth plains material, which is very different in texture from the surrounding terrain.  It is one of 110 peak ring basins on Mercury.

Boethius crater is west of Polygnotus.

References

Impact craters on Mercury